Baarsma is a surname. Notable people with the surname include:

 Bill Baarsma, American politician and academic
 Barbara Baarsma (born 1969), Dutch economist 

Dutch-language surnames